The Yali Falls Dam is the second largest dam in Vietnam, located in Gia Lai and Kon Tum provinces on the Krong Poko, a tributary of the Sesan River, in the Central Highlands of Vietnam, about  upstream of the Cambodian border. The -high dam was begun in 1993 and sealed in 1996, with the  reservoir filled by 1998. It aims to generate 720 MW of hydropower.

Like many large dam projects, it has been highly criticised, for causing flooding, damaging fisheries and for the lack of consultation with Cambodian authorities. Amongst those opposing the dam are the Sesan-Srepok-Sesong Protection Network (3SPN), organising 59 villages in northeast Cambodia to promote the environment in the three river basins and supported by Oxfam.

References
 Phoel, Cynthia M., "Bargaining Power", in Oxfam Exchange, Fall 2004, 8–9.
 http://www.mekong.es.usyd.edu.au/case_studies/sesan/yalifallsdam/yalifallsdam.htm (accessed 13 December 2008)
 Heavy water release from Vietnam's Yali Falls dam floods communities in northeastern Cambodia, press release, Probe International, 29 July 2008. (Accessed 26 June 2011.)
 TERRA, (2000) "Proposed Dams on the Se San River", Oxfam Community Aid Abroad. April, 2000. 

Dams in Vietnam
Hydroelectric power stations in Vietnam
Dams in the Mekong River Basin
Dams completed in 1996
Buildings and structures in Gia Lai province
Buildings and structures in Kon Tum province
Underground power stations
1996 establishments in Vietnam